Podocarpus degeneri is a species of conifer in the family Podocarpaceae. It is found only in Fiji.

References

degeneri
Least concern plants
Taxonomy articles created by Polbot
Taxobox binomials not recognized by IUCN